Heintzosteus is an extinct genus of placoderm fish,

References

Placoderms of Europe
Phlyctaeniidae